The 17 cm mittlerer Minenwerfer (17 cm mMW) was a mortar used by Germany in World War I.

Development and use
The weapon was developed for use by engineer troops after the Siege of Port Arthur during the Russo-Japanese War of 1905. It illustrated the usefulness of this type of weapon in destroying bunkers and field fortifications otherwise immune to normal artillery. It was a muzzle-loading, rifled mortar that had a standard hydro-spring recoil system. It fired 50 kilogram (110 lb) HE shells, which contained far more explosive filler than ordinary artillery shells of the same caliber. The low muzzle velocity allowed for thinner shell walls, hence more space for filler. Furthermore, the low velocity allowed for the use of explosives like ammonium nitrate-carbon that were less shock-resistant than TNT, which was in short supply. This caused a large number of premature detonations that made crewing the Minenwerfer riskier than normal artillery pieces.

A new version of the weapon, with a longer barrel, was put into production at some point during the war. It was called the 17 cm mMW n/A (neuer Art) or 'new pattern', while the older model was termed the a/A (alter Art) or 'old pattern'.

In action the mMW was emplaced in a pit, after its wheels were removed, not less than 1.5 meters deep to protect it and its crew. It could be towed short distances by four men or carried by 17. Despite its extremely short range, the mMW proved to be very effective at destroying bunkers and other field fortifications. Consequently, its numbers went from 116 in service when the war broke out to some 2,361 in 1918.

Two pieces of 17 cm mMW was also used by SS Heimwehr Danzig troops during the invasion of Poland.

Surviving examples
The Central Museum of The Royal Regiment of Canadian Artillery, Shilo, Manitoba
At the Australian War Memorial, Canberra
Also in Auburn, Massachusetts, an early short barrel model survives at the American Legion Hall
a/A (1917 Rh.MF. Nr.5763) at the Queensland Museum], Brisbane
n/A (1917 Sächsische Maschinen Fabrik Nr 5184) at the Campbeltown Heritage Centre, Scotland
4980 outside the District Council Service Center, Roxburgh, Otago New Zealand.
Wilbur Avenue, Cranston, Rhode Island
Memorial Hall, Monson, Massachusetts
Falls Park, Pendleton, Indiana USA
Stavely Centennial Park in Stavely, Alberta has a short-barreled version (serial number 1972) of the mortar on display along with a Spandau machine gun.
The Vytautas the Great War Museum https://www.vdkaromuziejus.lt/en/

See also
 Minenwerfer
7.58 cm leichte Minenwerfer
25 cm schwerer Minenwerfer

Photo Gallery

Notes

References
 Jäger, Herbert. (2001). German Artillery of World War One. Ramsbury, Marlborough, Wiltshire: Crowood Press. .

External links
 mMW on Landships

World War I mortars of Germany
170 mm artillery
Rheinmetall